Africa Challenge is a televised academic competition for students of African universities. It has previously been sponsored by Zain Telecommunications and was known as Zain Africa Challenge. Prior to the acquisition of MTC, Celtel's parent company, the competition was known as the Celtel Africa Challenge. The programme was an extension of Celtel’s corporate social responsibility initiative known as “Making Life Better”, further adopted and retained by Zain. It was created by Richard Reid and produced by Richard Reid Productions, which also produces the Honda Campus All-Star Challenge in the United States.

Season five, which was set to be telecast in 2011, failed to make it past pre-production after the Zain sold its African network operations to Bharti Airtel.

Zain Africa Challenge was hosted by John Sibi-Okumu.

Game Format
Africa Challenge is a question-and-answer game played between two teams of three players each. The game is played in four rounds. The first three rounds are called Face-Off Rounds. The fourth round is called the Ultimate Challenge.

Face-Off Rounds
In each of these rounds, there are two types of questions: Face-Offs, worth 10 points each, and Bonuses, worth 20 points. In each of the three Face-Off rounds, a different player represents the team answering Face-Off questions. That player is the only one who can answer for his or her team.

On Face-Offs, after the entire question is read, the first player to signal gets to answer. If s/he answers correctly, the team gets a Bonus question. If s/he answers wrong, the player representing the other team gets a chance to answer the Face-Off. If that player answers correctly, his or her team gets the Bonus. Bonuses are played by the entire team.

In each Face-Off round, there are four new categories. In each category there are four Face-Off questions. Each Face-Off has a related Bonus question. The last player to correctly answer a Face-Off selects the category for the next Face-Off.

Ultimate Challenge
At the end of the three Face-Off rounds, the teams play the Ultimate Challenge. The team that’s behind goes first. If there’s a tie, a coin toss occurs and the team that wins decides if it wants to go first or last. Each team gets a turn to play the Ultimate Challenge. There are four new categories from which to choose. When it’s a team’s turn to play, the players confer and select the category. Once a category is selected, it is no longer available.

In the Ultimate Challenge, the team has 60 seconds to answer 10 questions. The questions are read rapid-fire one after the other. Team members can confer on answers. Any team member may call out an answer. The first answer heard by the moderator is the one that will be accepted. As long as there is time remaining, teams can keep coming back to questions which they missed or on which they passed.

Each question is worth 50 points, and if a team can answer all 10 questions correctly, then in addition to the 500 points, each team member receives a US$500 bonus. Even if the first team to play the Ultimate Challenge does not take the lead in the game, the second team plays the Ultimate Challenge because the team members have a chance to win the bonus money.

The team with the most points at the end of the Ultimate Challenge wins the game.

Grants and Prizes
Zain provided grants to the 16 participating universities and to the students who represent the universities at the Zain Africa Challenge Championship Festival.

Universities who participate in the first-round of the knockout competition receive US$5,000 and each player receives $500.

As the competition progresses, the monetary and other grants increase:
 Quarter-final universities receive US$100,000 and each player receives $1,000
 Semi-final universities receive US$1,500,000 and each player receives $1,000 plus $500 in educational materials
 The runner-up university receives US$2,500,000 and each player receives $1,000 plus $1,500 in educational materials
 The champion university receives US$5,000,000 and each player receives $1,000 plus $3,500 in educational materials

In addition, players whose teams sweep the Ultimate Challenge round in any televised match receive a US$500 per-person bonus.

See also
 Celtel Africa Challenge Season 2

References

External links
 Richard Reid TV, Producers of ZAC
 Official website

Student quiz television series
Mass media in Africa